The Chee Kung Tong Society Hall was a former Chinese society hall located on 2151 Vineyard Street in Wailuku, Maui. Built to provide services to single immigrant Chinese males, mostly working for the sugarcane plantations, it provided religious and political help, in addition to mutual aid. Converted to a dormitory in the 1920s, it suffered neglect until finally collapsing in 1996. The site now contains remnants of the foundation, assorted cement structures, and a distinct lintel gate and wall facing the street. The site was placed on the Hawaii State Register of Historic Places and the National Register of Historic Places (under the Chinese Tong Houses of Maui Island TR nomination form), but delisted from the State register after its collapse; it is still listed in the NRHP database.

History

It is unclear when the society hall was first built due to conflicting information; County of Maui records indicate that the building was first listed as being built in 1897, though an article from December 1904 by the Maui News lists the building being built and celebrations made upon completion of the society hall on January 14 and 15, 1905.

The hall provided a place for Chinese immigrants to visit, socialize (such as playing pai gow), and provide aid.

Sometime in 1928, it was noted that the society hall was converted for use as a dormitory by single men, and this use was supposedly practiced up until the 1960s. After the last occupant died, the property was neglected.

Collapse

In September 1988, part of a wall of the building collapsed, smashing adjacent trees, plants, and two clothesline poles in a neighboring property.

On April 17, 1996, the derelict wood building collapsed due to damage caused by wood rot, termites, and gravity. Before the collapse, Society Elders had planned to meet to discuss the fate of the building. Certain elements of the building were to have been recovered, and possibly reused in the reconstruction of the building.

Design

The property is  according to Maui County tax records via the Department of Finance's Real Property Division and the NRHP nomination form.

The entrance gate comprises two concrete posts and a lintel with Chinese characters on it. Formerly delineated in red, the front facing the street contains incused Chinese characters spelling out Chee Kung Fui Kon, and the back containing the phrase (translated as) Everyone is equal.

Architectural elements included shingled intersecting gabled roofs with gabled ends and fish-scaled shingles painted in various colors. Assorted other details included a scalloped archway, chamfered posts, decorative wheel and quatrefoil brackets, and an entrance gable with a carved bridgeboard. Diamonds and rectangles were also incorporated into the structure via ornamental lintels and balustrades.

Historic listings

The site was placed on the Hawaii State Register of Historic Places on July 30, 1982 and the National Register of Historic Places on November 15, 1982, but delisted in August 1998 from the State register; it is still listed in the NRHP database.

Current condition

Today, the site consists of only a few cement structures and several trees obscuring the front of the property. The gate and adjoining walls, stairs, sidewalks, foundation pillars, and the cinderblock addition lie in decrepit condition. The phrase Everyone is equal is barely discernible behind the lintel on the gate.

As of 2010, a property listing sale noted additional details, including the lack of a water meter and possible building restrictions due to it being under the jurisdiction of a redevelopment authority.

Gallery

References

Further reading

External links

Cultural infrastructure completed in 1904
Clubhouses on the National Register of Historic Places in Hawaii
Culture of Maui
Collapsed buildings in the United States
Buildings and structures in Maui County, Hawaii
Clubhouses in Hawaii
Chinese-American culture in Hawaii
Historic American Buildings Survey in Hawaii
Buildings and structures demolished in 1996
1904 establishments in Hawaii
1996 disestablishments in Hawaii
National Register of Historic Places in Maui County, Hawaii
Hawaii Register of Historic Places